Patrick W. Corrigan is a US-based author and advocate for people with a mental illness, particularly in relation to the issue of stigma. He has written more than 15 books and 400 peer reviewed articles specializing in issues related to the mental illness stigmas. Corrigan suffered from mental illness himself and is most likely the reason his research has this focus. Corrigan currently resides in Northern Illinois, and family life is unknown.

Professional life
Since 1992, Corrigan has been on the faculty at the University of Chicago and also serves as an investigator for the Chicago Consortium for Stigma Research.  Corrigan is currently a distinguished professor of psychology and Associate Dean at Illinois Institute of Technology where he received his doctorate in psychology.

In 1998, Corrigan was added to the Who's Who of the World. One of his most noted books is "Don't Call Me Nuts : Coping with the Stigma of Mental Illness", which discusses many issues relating to mental illness including the issue of indiscriminate disclosure.  More recently, he has edited "On the Stigma of Mental Illness: Practical strategies for research and social change" which illustrated perspectives from a wide variety of sources, including people with a mental illness, to look at practical affirmative action tactics that can be used to fight against stigma.

Published work and research 
Patrick Corrigan's  writing is focused around the public stigma of mental illness. His research shows ways to overcome and educate others on the affects Stigmas have on the mental illness community. Majority of his work highlights the importance of community, and personal contact within the recovery stages. Corrigan allows his work to be unbiased and includes many different ways to help deter stigmas including religion and faith based practices. His research allows readers to see different correlations and comparisons within the topic, such as racial and suicide attempt survivor stigmas. Corrigan notes that the idea of color blindness can transfer to mental illness and has the same affect on the population. His work also references how a prognosis can be detrimental to a patient in a way were they are held to the same stigmas of their newly named illness.

Follows is a list of published books

 Principles and Practice of Psychiatric Rehabilitation : An Empirical Approach
 Challenging the Stigma of Mental Illness : Lessons for Therapists and Advocates
 The Stigma of Disease and Disability : Understanding Causes and Overcoming Injustices
 Interactive Staff Training : Rehabilitation Teams that Work
 Health and Wellness in People Living With Serious Mental Illness
 Person-Centered Care for Mental Illness : The Evolution of Adherence and Self-Determination
 Principles and Practice of Psychiatric Rehabilitation, First Edition : An Empirical Approach
 The Power of Peer Providers in Mental Health Services
 Cognitive Rehabilitation for Neuropsychiatric Disorders
 On the Stigma of Mental Illness : Practical Strategies for Research and Social Change
 Don't Call Me Nuts! : Coping with the Stigma of Mental Illness
 Practice Guidelines for Extended Psychiatric Residential Care : From Chaos to Collaboration
 Social Cognition and Schizophrenia

References

Year of birth missing (living people)
Living people
American health and wellness writers
American social sciences writers
Illinois Institute of Technology faculty
Place of birth missing (living people)